Pretty Bayou is a census-designated place (CDP) in Bay County, Florida, United States. The population was 3,206 at the 2010 census. It is part of the Panama City–Lynn Haven–Panama City Beach Metropolitan Statistical Area. In 2018, Hurricane Michael caused significant damage to the city.

Geography
Pretty Bayou is located at  (30.195901, -85.696528).

Demographics

As of the census of 2010, there were 3,206 people, 1,310 households, and 921 families residing in the CDP. The racial makeup of the CDP was 91.5% White, 3.1% African American, 0.4% American Indian or Alaska Native, 1.8% Asian, 0.8% some other race, and 2.2% from two or more races. Hispanic or Latino of any race were 3.3% of the population.

There were 1,310 households, out of which 21.3% had children under the age of 18 living with them, 57.3% were headed by married couples living together, 8.7% had a female householder with no husband present, and 29.7% were non-families. 24.0% of all households were made up of individuals, and 10.6% were someone living alone who was 65 years of age or older.  The average household size was 2.36, and the average family size was 2.77.

In the CDP, the population was spread out, with 17.5% under the age of 18, 6.0% from 18 to 24, 19.5% from 25 to 44, 31.6% from 45 to 64, and 25.3% who were 65 years of age or older.  The median age was 49.7 years. For every 100 females, there were 98.5 males.  For every 100 females age 18 and over, there were 93.4 males.

At the 2000 census, the median income for a household in the CDP was $48,347, and the median income for a family was $56,856. Males had a median income of $39,261 versus $29,185 for females. The per capita income for the CDP was $26,930.  About 4.0% of families and 6.0% of the population were below the poverty line, including 5.5% of those under age 18 and 4.6% of those age 65 or over.

References

Census-designated places in Bay County, Florida
Census-designated places in Florida
Populated places on the Intracoastal Waterway in Florida